Profanity in Finnish is used in the form of intensifiers, adjectives, adverbs and particles. There is also an aggressive mood that involves omission of the negative verb  while implying its meaning with a swear word.

Contemporary Finnish profanity often has old origins; several such words have Pagan roots that after Christian influence were turned from names of deities and spirits to profanity and used as such. In general, the etymology of Finnish swears can be traced either from these formerly religious words or from ancient Finnish words involving excretion or sexual organs or functions.
People of countries neighboring Finland often consider Finnish swear words harsher than their own, and even use heavily mispronounced versions of them, most notably perkele. Native Finns tend to consider the harshness exaggerated, while others use it to their advantage. 
Finns swear more than their Nordic neighbors or Central Europeans, reaching the same level as Scots or Russians.

These were more prominent in older Finnish, e.g.  is closest to (corpse) or like  (the beast). There are also other similar non-offensive constructs like  (tallow candles of heaven). There is also an inventory of non-offensive curse words.

List of Finnish profanities

helvetti
 
 Helvetti translates to hell and has roughly the same meaning in the English language. It has its roots in the Swedish word helvete, with the same meaning (underworld punishment). An often used phrase is "What the hell?", in Finnish "Mitä helvettiä?". For an augmentative expression, both in a positive or negative sense, helvetin can be prefixed into an adjective, e.g. helvetin hyvä "hellishly good". A pejorative meaning can be achieved by using the same helvetin ("of hell") in front of a noun, e.g. helvetin bussi oli myöhässä "the damned bus was late". Some words used to replace it, depending on dialect, include helkutti, helvata, hemmetti, hemskutti, himputti, helkkari and himskatti. Derivative terms: helvetillinen ("infernal").

hitto, hiisi

 Hitto is a relatively mild swear word, but still considered an expletive. A hiisi is a scary mythical creature such as a giant, troll or devil, or its dwelling such as a sacred grove, burial site and on the other hand, hell. The word has a Germanic etymology, either from *sidon "side or direction" (in English, "side"), or *xitha "cave, hollow, crag" (Swedish: ide, "bear's nest"). Its diminutive form is "hittolainen", and the ancient pagan deity Hittavainen is related.  The word is in the same category as other "mild" swear words like "helkkari" or "himskatti". Painu hiiteen means "go to hell", while hiisi vieköön is "may the devil take it!". Hitto is usually translated Damn (it). One of the funniest forms of using hitto could be hitto soikoon, "may the hitto chime", and may be similar to the English phrase "Hell's bells".

huora
 The word means whore, and like the English word which has the same etymology may be considered too profane for civil conversation, to be replaced by seksinmyyjä "sex worker" in the literal meaning. Although it can be used to call someone names, it is not used as a swear word on its own (cf. Spanish or Polish).

jumalauta
 This is a combination of two words: jumala, meaning god, and auta, meaning help (verb, imperative 2nd person). It is used in a similar fashion to Oh my God/God help (me)! In Finnish it has the same slightly frustrated emphasis. Another translation for Oh, God is Voi luoja (luoja = the creator, a synonym for God). An ad campaign for church aid for third world countries used JumalAuta as an eyecatcher. This raised discussion for being too profane. Though the English expression God help me is an accurate (and literal) translation of jumalauta, a translation to goddamn it may be considered more correct, as the literal translation lacks the undertones of profanity. Often used replacement words are jumankauta, jumaliste or jumalavita.

kikkeli
 A word for "penis" often used by children, usually literally, considered somewhat profane. Comparable to "willy" or "dingaling". Pronounced .

kusi
 Kusi, pronounced , means "urine" with a similar connotation to "piss". By itself it refers to actual urine and is considered only mildly offensive in colloquial language. The etymology is traced up to Proto-Uralic, the earliest known protolanguage of Finnish, thus having cognates in other Uralic languages, such as húgy in Hungarian language. It is used by people in compound words, such as kusipää (pisshead, common translation of "asshole"), as very offensive insults. Inoffensive synonyms are the clinical term virtsa ("urine") and the childish pissa ("pee"). The word pissa has drifted so far into everyday usage that in combined form pissapoika (pissing boy) it refers specifically to the squirter on the windshield of cars. Foreign visitors have been amused by the product "Superpiss" for windshield wiper fluid. Derivative terms: kusettaa (jotakuta) "to defraud, to cheat (someone)", similar in meaning as "to bullshit (someone)", kusettaa (in passive mood) "feel an urge to urinate" (these differ by case government: the former is always accompanied by a subject in the partitive case), kusinen "shitty" or "stained with piss" (e.g. kusinen paikka "up shit creek"), juosten kustu literally "pissed while running", meaning half-assed, hastily done, shoddy, incompetent work, and kustu muroihin "pissed in cereal", referring to a disservice, an act that hurts someone or the common benefit.

kyrpä 
 Literally "cock" in the sense of "penis"; often considered highly offensive. The word nearly always refers to an actual penis and may be used, for example, to express frustration: Voi kyrpä! "Oh fuck!". The widespread verb vituttaa "to feel angry and depressed" originates from its meaning "to want vagina". Therefore, classically, heterosexual women should not use vituttaa, but kyrpiä, e.g. kyrpii "this makes me feel bad". One form of using the word is "kyrpä otsassa", which means that someone really pisses you off being an annoying person or total moron (or dickhead). Therefore, that annoying person is the one having "kyrpä otsassa". The literal meaning is "to have a dick on the forehead".

molo
 Usually used only literally for "penis", somewhat profane. Has a derivation molopää, corresponding to English "dickhead".

mulkku 
 Has the literal meaning "penis", but may refer, like English "prick", to an unpleasant man, both as a noun and as an adjective. When referring to a man, it is nowadays sometimes combined with Swedish surname ending -qvist, to form mulqvist or mulkvisti, which is considered less harsh than mulkku. In some dialects word mulkku is pronounced with an extra /u/ sound (epenthetic vowel), i.e. mulukku.

muna
 Literally means "egg" and may refer to a literal penis, but is not considered an insult or particularly profane. For example, there is a gay cruise named Munaristeily, which is publicly marketed as such. It also means "testicle", usually said in plural form munat "testicles". Olla munaa can mean either being courageous or just obscene, to "have balls".

paska
 Paska translates as "shit" or "crap" and has approximately the same context in English and Finnish, although it may be more profane. It has the same connotations of "shoddy" or "broken", which may even surpass the word's use in the original sense in frequency. Inoffensive synonyms are kakka ("poo"), especially with children, and the clinical uloste ("excrement"). Uloste appears to have been introduced as a high-class replacement in the 1800s, while paska is believed to have been in continuous use since at least the Proto-Finnic of 3000 BC. Doubt and disbelief are expressed with hevonpaska ("horse's shit", compare "bullshit") and paskan marjat ("shit's berries"). It can be combined with vittu as in "Vittu tätä paskaa" ("fuck this shit"). A Finnish rock musician goes by the name, and Paskahousu ("shitpants") is a card game, a relative of Shithead that's popular with children and teenagers. Derivative terms: paskiainen "bastard" (or "son of a bitch"), paskamainen "unfair, depressing, unpleasant, shitty", paskainen "(literally) shitty", paskapää "(literally) shithead".

perkele

In an early translation of The Bible to Finnish, the word was stated to be a word for the devil, thus making it a sin to be uttered. However, later, in 1992 translation, the word is switched to paholainen. Perkele or Ukko was known as the rain and thundergod, similar to Thor of Norse mythology. The "r" can be rolled and lengthened, which can be transcribed by repeating it. 

The word is very common in the country and likely the best known expletive abroad, and enjoys a kind of emblematic status. For instance, the Finnish black metal band Impaled Nazarene named its 1994 patriotic album Suomi Finland Perkele (using the word as a reference to Finnishness, not to the devil) and the more conventional M. A. Numminen released a 1971 album known as Perkele! Lauluja Suomesta ("Perkele! Songs from Finland"). When used to express discontent or frustration, perkele often suggests that the speaker is determined to solve the problem, even if it will be difficult. It is associated with sisu, which in turn is an iconic Finnish trait. Professor Kulonen has described perkele as being ingrained in the older generations, as opposed to kyrpä and vittu for the younger ones. A common and milder replacement word is perhana, and less popular variations include perkules, perskuta,  and perkeleissön. The word has lent itself to a Swedish expression for Finnish business management practices, "management by perkele". Derivative terms: perkeleellinen "infernal", perkelöityä "to escalate".

perse
 Perse ("ass") can be used either literally or as a semi-strong swear word. It is often found in expressions like "Tämä on perseestä" ("This (situation) is from the ass!" or "This sucks!") The similarities with the Latin phrase "per se", the Hungarian "persze" (which means "of course", comes from the aforementioned Latin and is pronounced mostly the same way), the hero Perseus and the ancient city of Persepolis are purely coincidental, although the wide use of "persze" in spoken Hungarian could sound somewhat embarrassing to Finnish visitors. Derivative terms: perseet (olalla), literally "to have one's arse up on one's shoulders", that is, "drunk".

pillu
 Pillu translates to "pussy" in the sense of female genitalia and, although it is not used as swear word, it is profane and unsuitable in all but the most familiar and informal conversation. Non-profane synonyms for the literal meaning include römpsä, tavara (lit. "stuff"), toosa (actually an oldish dialectical name with Swedish origin for a little box, container, "dosa"; it can also refer to televisions, electronics or machinery), pimppi, pimpsa, tuhero, tussu. The phrase tuhannen pillun päreiksi ("into shingles for thousand pussies") is similar or like the English saying "blown to smithereens", i.e. broken into thousands of pieces. It exhibits the tendency for alliteration in Finnish expressions. A pillunpäre ("pussy shingle") is a wood shingle used as a disposable bench cover in saunas.

piru

 Piru, meaning devil, is not always considered a swearword but sometimes used in a similar fashion to the word damn: "Piru vieköön" (lit. "let (the) Devil take (it)"). A more proper word for devil is paholainen. The derivative word pirullinen ("devilish", "diabolical") is used as in English; piruuttaan is roughly equivalent to "just for kicks", but the literal meaning "out of one's devilishness" is a more accurate translation.

reva
 Reva is another reference to the female genitalia, akin to "vittu" (see below). It is also used to refer to backside ("perse" or ass). However, it is not an actual swearword but carries a notion of vulgarity. The former chairman of Finnish Parliament, Mrs. Riitta Uosukainen used the word in her controversial autobiography Liehuva liekinvarsi, where she described herself in the sexual encounters between her and Mr. Topi Uosukainen as rintaa, reittä ja revää ("[I was nothing but]... breasts, thighs and quim.") Reva is also used occasionally in reference to buttocks and can therefore also be translated as "arse".

runkata
 Runkata (verb) is an informal and profane word that means "to masturbate". "Runkata", and the agent runkkari or runkku ("wanker", "jerk-off") are quite offensive words and rarely used outside of direct insults, most often combined with other swearwords. When used by itself, its meaning is normally more literal.

ryökäle
 Scoundrel. A curse word specific to the older generation, now considered non-offensive.

Saatana
 Saatana means quite literally Satan, but used in a similar fashion to helvetti. Often used less crude replacement words for it are saamari, samperi and saakeli. Along with "perkele", "vittu" and "jumalauta", this is one of the most classic and most used words in Finnish. Often used together with helvetti as saatanan helvetti. The derivative term saatanallinen ("satanic") is used in context as in English. Finnish group The Dudesons, in The Dudesons Movie, declared Saatana and Perkele to be the most common things heard on the show, Perkele being Satan's grandfather.

skeida
 Skeida (skay-dah) is Helsinki slang for "shit". Because of its newer origin, it is considered less profane than paska, although still not exactly a nice word to say. Skeida can be used as a profane insult (tää on täyttä skeidaa "this is full of shit") but unlike paska, it is not used as an exclamation or a curse by itself. Although the word is fairly well known in Helsinki, people from outside the capital area might not understand it. Skeida is also used to mean garbage or trash.

vittu
 Vittu is an ancient word for the female genitalia, glorifying the vagina.

References

 Slangi.net sanastot – Net based Finnish - Helsinki slang dictionary (in Finnish)

Profanity
 
Profanity by language